"Paris Is Burning" is a song by New Zealand singer Ladyhawke, released on 30 June 2008 as the second single from her self-titled debut studio album. It was written by Ladyhawke, Roy Kerr and Anu Pillai and produced by the latter two under the name Kid Gloves. The single is Ladyhawke's first to receive a physical release. On 6 July 2008, it was released in the United States. The song has been featured in season three of Ugly Betty, as a theme song for the French television series Paris 16e and Le Grand Journals "coming next" sequence, and remixed for the beginning of a CSI: Miami episode in the seventh season.

Commercial performance
"Paris Is Burning" debuted at number 61 on the UK Singles Chart, dropping 39 places to number 100 the following week. It entered the New Zealand Singles Chart at number 40, making it Ladyhawke's highest-charting song. In Australia it peaked at number 52, despite the song being in heavy rotation on Channel V Australia.

The track was re-released on 2 March 2009 as a digital download and limited-edition 7-inch vinyl. The reissue attained a new peak position of number 47 on the UK chart.

Music video
The video for "Paris Is Burning" includes Ladyhawke walking through a street with a wolf ahead of her, intermittently showing her walking through falling feathers, electric sparks, and bits of plastic. She also carries a drunk man and is followed by people for portions of the music video before she walks into a bright light in the distance with the wolf, car alarms blaring as the video fades. The video was directed by Danish director Casper Balslev.

Track listings
CD
(MODCDS058; Released: 7 July 2008)

 "Paris Is Burning" – 3:49
 "Paris Is Burning" (Cut Copy Remix) – 5:24
 "Paris Is Burning" (Kid Gloves CDG Chi Remix) – 6:43
 "Paris Is Burning" (A Chicken Lips Malfunction) – 6:38
 "Paris Is Burning" (Chicken Lips Dub Deluxe) – 6:38
 "Paris Is Burning" (Video)

UK 7-inch single
(MODVL 97; Released: 2008)

A. "Paris Is Burning" (Original)
B. "Paris Is Burning" (Alex Gopher Remix)

UK 7-inch single
(MODVL 98; Released: 2008)

A. "Paris Is Burning" (Peaches Remix)
B. "Paris S'enflamme"

US digital EP
(Released: 2008)

 "Paris Is Burning" – 3:51
 "Back of the Van" – 3:38
 "Paris s'enflamme" (French version of "Paris Is Burning") – 3:51
 "Paris Is Burning" (Cut Copy Remix) – 5:24
 "Back of the Van" (Van She Tech Turbo Fire Engine Mix) – 6:07
 "Danny & Jenny" – 3:31

European digital single
(Released: 2 March 2009)

 "Paris Is Burning" (Radio Edit)
 "Paris Is Burning" (Matthew Dekay Remix)
 "Paris Is Burning" (Simmons and Cristopher Radio Mix)
 "Paris Is Burning" (Simmons and Cristopher Club Mix)
 "Paris Is Burning" (Innerpartysystem Remix)
 "Paris Is Burning" (Funkagenda Remix)
 "Paris Is Burning" (Original)

Limited white 7-inch single
(MODVL113; Released: 2 March 2009)
Limited to 600 copies

A. "Paris Is Burning"
B. "Paris Is Burning" (Chicken Lips Zeefungk Beatdown)

Other versions
 "Paris Is Burning" (Alex Metric Remix) – 4:49
 "Paris Is Burning" (Fred Falke Mix) – 6:42
 "Paris Is Burning" (Kim Fai Remix) – 7:24

Charts

References

2008 songs
2008 singles
2009 singles
Island Records singles
Ladyhawke (musician) songs
Modular Recordings singles
Songs about Paris
Songs written by Ladyhawke (musician)
Song recordings produced by Roy Kerr (mashup artist)